Załęcze Landscape Park (Załęczański Park Krajobrazowy) is a protected area (Landscape Park) in central Poland.

The Park is shared between two voivodeships: Łódź Voivodeship and Silesian Voivodeship.

Landscape parks in Poland
Parks in Łódź Voivodeship